"Take Your Chance" is a song by German Eurodance band Fun Factory, released in August 1994 as the fourth single from their debut album, NonStop! The Album (1994). The song is written by Bülent Aris, Rainer Kesselbauer, Toni Cottura, and Rodney Hardison. It reached number 18 in Germany, number 35 in Sweden and number five on the Canadian RPM Dance/Urban chart.

Critical reception
Pan-European magazine Music & Media wrote in their review of the single, "In a "1984" doom-type prophecy everybody says the end of Euro is near, and all involved should change their musical course. Here, the adjustments are the presence of rap and ragga rhymes."

Music video
The accompanying music video for "Take Your Chance" was directed by Steve Willis and released in summer of 1994. It was A-listed on Germany's VIVA in October 1994.

Track listings
 CD maxi-single (Europe, 1994)
 "Take Your Chance" (Take The Airwaves Mix) – 3:56
 "Take Your Chance" (Take The Original Mix) – 5:45
 "Take Your Chance" (Take The Tribe Mix) – 5:53
 "Take Your Chance" (Take The Remix) – 5:38

Charts

Weekly charts

Year-end charts

References

1994 singles
1994 songs
English-language German songs
Fun Factory (band) songs
Songs written by Bülent Aris
Songs written by Toni Cottura